Excusable negligence is a paradoxical phrase, since if the failure to exercise reasonable care under the circumstances is excusable, there is no negligence. 38 Am J1st Negl § 12.  As used in statutes authorizing the opening of a default and allowing a party to defend on the merits, the standard set by courts is slippery to define, but cases seem to agree that a reasonable excuse is sufficient, where it appears that the defense is meritorious and no substantial prejudice will result from setting aside the default.

References
 Citizens' Nat. Bank v Branden, 19 ND 489, 126 NW 102

Law of negligence
Paradoxes